The  was a planned high-speed Shinkansen ("bullet train") line proposed to connect Narita International Airport with Tokyo Station. The project was abandoned in 1987, although parts of the planned route are used by the Keisei Narita Airport Line (Narita Sky Access).

History
Planning of the Narita Shinkansen started in 1966 and permission to build was granted in 1972, with completion initially scheduled for 1976, in time for the airport's opening.  Construction started 1974, but was significantly hampered due to resistance from local residents protesting against the expropriation of their land for a project that would bring no benefit to them. (Similar issues have afflicted Narita Airport itself.) Construction was frozen in 1983, and the Basic Plan granting construction rights was cancelled by a special law in 1987 — the only Shinkansen line ever to meet this fate.

Due to the opposition, only a 9 km stretch of trackbed and the airport station shell had been constructed before the project was halted.  While the Shinkansen link was stalled, the private Keisei Electric Railway had constructed an ordinary rail link to the airport. However, Keisei services had to terminate outside airport grounds and transfer passengers by bus, as the station inside the airport and the track connecting to it was owned by then state operator Japanese National Railways.

After the passage of the groundbreaking Railway Business Act in 1986, Keisei acquired the rights to operate as a "third type" (第3種) railway company that leases tracks from JR, and starting in 1991 both Keisei and JR have operated direct airport services to the terminal built for the Shinkansen. The culvert connecting to the airport station was also designed for Shinkansen use.

Route

The line was to originate at underground platforms located roughly equidistant from Tokyo Station and Yūrakuchō Station in central Tokyo. From there, it was to run underground to Etchūjima in Kōtō Ward, then above ground, following the Tōzai Line route across the Ara River to Funabashi. In Funabashi, the line was to again run underground, emerging in Shiroi, then following a smooth curve through Chiba New Town and central Narita, and finally running underground again to terminate beneath the passenger terminal at Narita Airport. Originally, the Tokyo-Narita trains were to make no station stops: JNR later added one additional station to the planned line to serve Chiba New Town.

A depot for trains operating on the line was planned at a location approximately 51 km from Tokyo, including a single-track connecting link to the JR Narita Line at Shimōsa-Manzaki Station.

Much of this right of way is used by commuter lines. The area of Tokyo Station earmarked for the Shinkansen platforms and the tunnel to Etchujima are now used by the JR Keiyō Line. Much of the above-ground right of way had already been earmarked by the Chiba Prefecture for railway use. The Hokusō Railway uses one segment of this right of way between Komuro and Chiba New Town, and another section between Chiba New Town and the airport is used as part of the Keisei Narita Airport Line.

Future
While revivals of the Narita Shinkansen have been proposed periodically, the cancellation of the basic plan, lack of political will and the construction of the Keisei Narita Airport Line as a replacement all combine to make this unlikely. The Keisei Narita Airport Line was built as standard gauge (like the Shinkansen), theoretically leaving a door open for eventual conversion. However, the Rapid Railway's design speed is only 160 km/h and it will — at least initially — terminate at Keisei Ueno Station, not the more central Shinkansen hub of Tokyo Station. Also, the Sky Access is electrified at 1500 V DC, whereas the Shinkansen standard is 25 kV AC.

Technical details
With a design speed of at least 200 km/h, the Narita Shinkansen was designed to cover the 65-kilometer distance in 35 minutes, including a stop at Chiba New Town.  The Narita Express takes 53 minutes for the same trip (non-stop but along different tracks, making a detour via Chiba), while the more direct Keisei Narita Airport Line connects Narita to Nippori in 36 minutes.

References

 "幻の成田新幹線をたどる" (Tracing the Fabled Narita Shinkansen), Japan Railfan Magazine, August 2008 issue, p. 110-117

External links
 JRTR 19: Air-Rail Links in Japan
 Mirai Tetsudo Database: Narita Shinkansen, retrieved 25 June 2008 

Shinkansen
High-speed railway lines in Japan
Narita International Airport
Cancelled airport rail links